Hamengkubuwono III (also spelled Hamengkubuwana III, February 20, 1769 – November 3, 1814) was the third sultan of Yogyakarta, reigning from 1810 to 1811 after his father's forced abdication. His father reclaimed the throne while the Europeans were distracted by the Napoleonic Wars, but was overthrown again by a British invasion supported by the Legiun Mangkunegaran, leaving Hamengkubuwono III to rule from 1812 to 1814.

See also
Hamengkubuwono

References

Bibliography

Sultans of Yogyakarta
Burials at Imogiri
Diponegoro
1769 births
1814 deaths
Indonesian royalty